Redway School is located in Southern Humboldt County, California. Redway School is a K-6 school serving 325 students in a  area.

See also
 List of Humboldt County Schools

References

Schools in Humboldt County, California